Bichancourt is a commune in the department of Aisne in Hauts-de-France in northern France.

Geography
The river Oise forms part of the commune's northern border; one of its tributaries, the  Ailette, forms all of the commune's southwestern border.

Population

See also
Communes of the Aisne department

References

Communes of Aisne
Aisne communes articles needing translation from French Wikipedia